Nada Daabousová (born 15 January 1997) is a Slovak synchronized swimmer. She competed in the women's duet at the 2016 Summer Olympics held in Rio de Janeiro, Brazil. Her greatest solo success, as well as the best result of a synchronized swimsuit in the history of Slovakia's independence, is the 7th place in Artistic swimming at the 2020 European Aquatics Championships – Solo free routine.

References

External links 
 Naďa Daabousová at the Slovenský Olympijský Výbor 
 

1997 births
Living people
Slovak synchronized swimmers
Olympic synchronized swimmers of Slovakia
Synchronized swimmers at the 2016 Summer Olympics
Place of birth missing (living people)
Synchronized swimmers at the 2017 World Aquatics Championships
European Games competitors for Slovakia
Synchronised swimmers at the 2015 European Games
Artistic swimmers at the 2019 World Aquatics Championships
Sportspeople from Bratislava